Abraeomorphus minutissimus is a species of beetle first described by Edmund Reitter in 1884. No subspecies are listed in Catalogue of Life.

References

Histeridae
Beetles described in 1884